The Sahara Solar Breeder Project is a joint Japanese-Algerian universities plan to use the abundant solar energy and sand in the Sahara desert to build silicon manufacturing plants, and solar power plants, in a way that their products are used in a "breeding" manner to build more and more such plants. The project's declared goal is to provide 50% of the world’s electricity by 2050, using superconductors to deliver the power to distant locations.

The project was first proposed by Hideomi Koinuma from the Science Council of Japan, at the 2009 G8+5 Academies' Meeting in Rome.

See also

 Renewable energy in Algeria

References

External links 
Sahara Solar Breeder Foundation official website

Proposed energy projects
Electric power infrastructure 
Proposed electric power infrastructure in Africa
Electric power infrastructure in Algeria
Proposed infrastructure
Renewable energy in Africa
Solar power in Algeria